Peter Landiak (November 4, 1917 – November 29, 2010), better known as Pete Langelle, was a Canadian professional ice hockey centre who played 137 games in the National Hockey League with the Toronto Maple Leafs from 1939 to 1942. He was born in Winnipeg, Manitoba.

Career statistics

Regular season and playoffs

Awards and achievements
Turnbull Cup MJHL Championship (1937)
Memorial Cup Championship (1937)
Stanley Cup Championship (1942)
Honoured Member of the Manitoba Hockey Hall of Fame.

References

External links
 

1917 births
2010 deaths
Canadian ice hockey centres
Canadian people of Ukrainian descent
Ice hockey people from Winnipeg
Pittsburgh Hornets players
Toronto Maple Leafs players
Syracuse Stars (AHL) players
Winnipeg Maroons players
Winnipeg Monarchs players